Logan Martin  (born 22 November 1993) is an Australian professional Dirt and Park Freestyle BMX rider. In 2021, Martin won the gold medal in the inaugural Men's BMX freestyle event at the 2020 Summer Olympics in Tokyo. 

Martin was only 12 years old when he first tried Freestyle BMX at his local park. In 2012 he traveled overseas for the first time and won his first international competition.

Martin debuted at the X-Games by taking Park silver at Austin 2016—the first rookie to score a BMX Park medal since Brazilian Diogo Canina in 2008. In 2019, he built his own competition-sized (30 by 15-metre) BMX park in his backyard after his local training facility closed, at a cost of $70,000. This meant that during the COVID-19 pandemic related lockdowns, he was able to remain training without leaving his property.

In the 2022 Australia Day Honours Martin was awarded the Medal of the Order of Australia.

Career

2011 

 2011 Free Flow Tour – Jaycee BMX Park Leg: 1st
 2011 Free Flow Tour Finals – BMX Park: 2nd

2012 
2012 FISE X Paris – BMX Spine: 1st

2013 
 2013 Play BMX Contest – Park: 2nd
 2013 FISE Montpellier –  BMX Park: 1st
 2013 Vital BMX Game Of BIKE Winner
2013 NASS – Park: 1st
2013 Simple Session – Finals: 6th
2013 Big Air Triples – Miami: 3rd

2014 

2014 FISE Montpellier –  BMX Park: 1st
2014 FISE Montpellier – BMX Air Spine: 3rd
2014 FISE China –  BMX Park: 1st
2014 FISE Malaysia –  BMX Park: 1st
2014 FISE World Series: 3rd
 2014 BMX Cologne Superbowl: 2nd
 2014 FISE Xpérience Marseille  – 1st
 2014 Dew Tour Beach Championships – BMX Park: 4th
 2014 NASS – Park: 1st
 2014 NASS – Dirt:  3rd
2014 Simple Session – Finals: 2nd

2015 
 2015 FISE World Series – Malaysia 1st / China 2nd / France: 3rd – Overall Winner
2015 FISE Montpellier –  BMX Spine Ramp: 2nd
 2015 FISE Montpellier –  BMX Park: 3rd

2015 Mongoose Jam'15 Dirt: 3rd
 2015 NASS – Park: 1st
 2015 NASS – Dirt: 3rd Note: qualifier position was used as final position due to rain.
2015 SPX – BMX Big Air Triples: 1st
2015 Recon Tour PRO at The Kitchen Park: 1st

2016 

2016 FISE Spine France: 1st
 2016 FISE (UCI) Osijek – Park: 1st (2016 UCI BMX World Cup Pannonian – Park: 1st) as part of 2016 World Series.
2016 FISE (UCI) Montpellier – BMX Park: 6th Note: qualifier position was used as final position due to rain. Part of 2016 World Series.
 2016 FISE (UCI) Denver – BMX Park: 6th Part of 2016 World Series.
2016 FISE (UCI) Edmonton – Park: 1st
2016 FISE (UCI) Chengdu – Park: 1st
2016 FISE World Series – Park: 1st
 2016 Nitro World Games – BMX Triple Hit: 2nd
 2016 X Games Austin – Park: 2nd
2016 X Games Austin – Best Trick: 99th
 2016 NASS – Park: 1st
 2016 NASS – Dirt: 13th

2017 
* 2017 Pannonian – BMX Park: 1st
 2017 UCI Urban Cycling World Championships – Park: 1st
 2017 X Games Minneapolis – Dirt: 2nd
 2017 X Games Minneapolis – Best Trick: 2nd
 2017 X Games Minneapolis – Park: 2nd
 2017 FISE Montpellier  – Spine: 1st
 2017 FISE Montpellier –  BMX Park: 1st
 2017 FISE Budapest –  BMX Park Demi Finale: 22nd & eliminated
 2017 FISE Edmonton –  BMX Park: 2nd
 2017 FISE (UCI) Chengdu – BMX Park: 2nd

2018 

 2018 X Games Minneapolis  –  Dirt: 2nd
2018 X Games Minneapolis  –  Best Trick: 2nd
2018 X Games Minneapolis  –  Park: 1st
2018 FISE Hiroshima – Did not play
2018 FISE Montpellier –  BMX Park: 2nd Note: demi-final position was used as final position due to rain.
2018 FISE Edmonton –  BMX Park: 1st
2018 FISE Chengdu –  Did not play, injured.
2018 FISE World Cup – 6th
2018 X Games Sydney  –  Dirt: 9th
2018 Ultimate X Africa (Sun City) –  Park: 2nd
2018 Nitro World Games  –  Park: 1st

2019 

 2019 FISE BOTC – BMX Park: 2nd
 2019 FISE Hiroshima – BMX Park: 3rd
 2019 FISE Montpellier World Cup – BMX Park: 3rd
2019 FISE (UCI) Chengdu World Cup – BMX Park: 4th Note: semi-final position was used as final position due to rain.
2019 FISE World Cup – 2nd
2019 Pannonian – BMX Park: 1st
2019 X Games Minneapolis – Dirt: 1st
2019 X Games Minneapolis – Park: 1st
2019 X Games Minneapolis – Best Trick: 7th
2019 World Urban Games – Park: 2nd
2019 UCI Urban Cycling World Championships – Park: 2nd
Australian National BMX Freestyle Park Championships: 1st

2020 

 Australian National BMX Freestyle Park Championships: 1st

2021 
Australian National BMX Freestyle Park Championships: 1st
2021 UCI Urban Cycling World Championships – Park: 1st
2021 Tokyo 2020 Summer Olympics – Men's Cycling BMX Freestyle: Gold Medallist

Personal life
In 2017, Martin moved to the Gold Coast where he spent $70,000 to build a Freestyle BMX park in his backyard. Martin had his first child, Noah Alexander, with partner Kimberley in 2019.

References

External links
 

1993 births
Australian male cyclists
BMX riders
Living people
Medalists at the 2020 Summer Olympics
Olympic gold medalists for Australia
Recipients of the Medal of the Order of Australia
Olympic medalists in cycling
X Games athletes
Cyclists at the 2020 Summer Olympics
Olympic cyclists of Australia
Sportsmen from Queensland
Sportspeople from the Gold Coast, Queensland